Nothobartsia is a genus of flowering plants belonging to the family Orobanchaceae.

Its native range is the Western Mediterranean.

Species
Species:

Nothobartsia asperrima 
Nothobartsia spicata

References

Orobanchaceae
Orobanchaceae genera